Paula Peláez G. served as the President of the Asociación de Guías y Scouts de Chile.
In 2000, Peláez was awarded the 285th Bronze Wolf, the only distinction of the World Organization of the Scout Movement, awarded by the World Scout Committee for exceptional services to world Scouting.

References

External links

Recipients of the Bronze Wolf Award
Year of birth missing
Scouting and Guiding in Chile